James F. Merton (October 7, 1845 – January 9, 1900) was a United States Navy sailor who received the Medal of Honor for actions during the Korean Expedition in 1871. Landsman Merton was severely wounded during the seizure of the forts.

Medal of Honor citation
Rank and organization: Landsman, U.S. Navy. Birth: England. G.O. No.: 180, October 10, 1872.

Citation:

Landsman and member of Company D during the capture of the Korean forts, 9 and 10 June 1871, Merton was severely wounded in the arm while trying to force his way into the fort.

See also
List of Medal of Honor recipients

References

External links

1845 births
1900 deaths
English-born Medal of Honor recipients
English emigrants to the United States
People from Cheshire
United States Navy sailors
United States Navy Medal of Honor recipients
Korean Expedition (1871) recipients of the Medal of Honor